According to the Hebrew Bible, the Tribe of Asher was one of the Tribes of Israel descended from Asher, the eighth son of Jacob. It is one of the ten lost tribes.

Biblical narrative
According to the biblical Book of Joshua, following the completion of the conquest of Canaan by the Israelite tribes, Joshua allocated the land among the twelve tribes. According to biblical scholar Kenneth Kitchen, one should date this conquest slightly after 1200 BC. This is referred to as a 'late date' with the main alternative of around 1500 BC referred to as the 'early date' for both the Exodus and conquest of Canaan. In opposition to both of these views, many critical scholars holds that the conquest of Joshua as described in the Book of Joshua never occurred.

In the biblical account, Joshua assigned to Asher western and coastal Galilee, a region with comparatively low temperature and much rainfall, making it some of the most fertile land in Canaan, with rich pasture, wooded hills, and orchards; as such Asher became particularly prosperous, and known for its olive oil. The Blessing of Moses appears to prophesy this allocation, although textual scholars view this as a postdiction.

From after the conquest of the land by Joshua until the formation of the first Kingdom of Israel in  1050 BC, the Tribe of Asher formed a part of a loose confederation of Israelite tribes. No central government existed, and in times of crisis the people were led by ad hoc figures known as Judges (see the Book of Judges). With the growth of the threat from Philistine incursions, the Israelite tribes decided to form a strong centralized monarchy to meet the challenge, and the Tribe of Asher joined the new kingdom, which had Saul as its first king. After the death of Saul, all the tribes other than Judah remained loyal to the House of Saul, and followed his son Ish-bosheth, but after Ish-bosheth's death, the Tribe of Asher joined the other northern Israelite tribes in making David, who was then the king of Judah, king of a re-united Kingdom of Israel.

On the accession of Rehoboam, David's grandson, in  930 BC the northern tribes split from the House of David to re-form a Kingdom of Israel as the Northern Kingdom. Asher remained a member of the new kingdom until Assyria conquered its territory in  723 BC and deported the population. From that time, tradition has counted the Tribe of Asher as one of the Ten Lost Tribes of Israel.

The New Testament describes Anna the prophetess and her father, Phanuel, as belonging to the Tribe of Asher.

Family tree

Archaeological evidence
A group referred to as Aseru, living in a similar region to Asher, are mentioned in Egyptian documents made by or for Seti I and Ramses II. Identification with the tribe of Asher is plausible according to Jewish scripts that date the Exodus in 1312 BC. Multiple estimates of non-religious historians have been made ranging from roughly 1200 to 1400 BC.

Territory

Despite the connection to this general geographic region, it is difficult to determine from the Torah the exact boundaries of the tribe, to the extent that it is even uncertain whether Asher even had continuous territory. Sites which according to the Bible were allocated to Asher, and whose locations have since been identified, appear to be a scattered distribution of settlements rather than a compact and well-defined tribal region. Perhaps because of the situation that its territory was in the area that was controlled by Phoenicia, Asher appears, throughout its history, to have been fairly disconnected from the other tribes of Israel; additionally it seems to have taken little part in the antagonism portrayed in the Torah between the Canaanites and the other tribes, for example in the war involving Barak and Sisera.

Critical scholars generally conclude that Asher consisted of certain clans that were affiliated with portions of the Israelite tribal confederation, but were never incorporated into the body politic. Another indication for this is that Asher together with Reuben and Gad (also detached) are the only tribes of which no person has ever been identified by name after the conquest and Asher and Gad are the only tribes not mentioned in the list of heads of tribes in I Chronicles 27.

Immigration
Ethiopian Jews, also known as Beta Israel, claim descent from the Tribe of Dan, whose members migrated south along with members of the tribes of Gad, Asher, and Naphtali, into the Kingdom of Kush, now Ethiopia and Sudan, during the destruction of the First Temple.

References

External links
Jewish Virtual Library

Jewish Lebanese history
Phoenicians in the Hebrew Bible
Tribes of Israel